McAllester is a surname. Notable people with the surname include:

 Bill McAllester (1888–1970), American baseball player
 David A. McAllester (born 1956), American academic
 David P. McAllester (1916–2006), American ethnomusicologist
 Jim McAllester (born 1959), Australian rules footballer